Eternal Wheel (The Best Of Ozric Tentacles) is a two-disc compilation record released by Ozric Tentacles in 2004.

Track listing

Disc one
"Jurassic Shift" (from "Jurassic Shift") - 11:04
"Myriapod" (from "Arborescence") - 5:59
"Saucers" (from "Strangeitude") - 7:32
"Wob Glass" (from "Become the Other") - 7:52
"Coily" (from "Waterfall Cities") - 7:19
"Sultana Detrii" (from "Waterfall Cities") - 9:17
"Sunscape" (from "Erpland") - 4:02
"Eternal Wheel" (from "Erpland") - 8:20
"Vibuthi" (from "Become the Other") - 10:50
"Sploosh!" (from "Strangeitude") - 6:26

Disc two
"Oolite Grove" (from "Curious Corn") - 5:57
"Ashlandi Bol" (from "The Hidden Step") - 6:21
"Iscence" (from "Erpland") - 3:47
"Pyramidion" (from "Pyramidion") - 6:04
"Spyroid" (from "Curious Corn") - 4:37
"Neurochasm" (from "Become the Other") - 6:47
"Kick Muck" (live video track) - 5:18

References

Ozric Tentacles albums
2004 greatest hits albums